The Journal of Vaishnava Studies, also known as Journal of Vaiṣṇava Studies, is an academic journal that was established in 1992 by Steven J. Rosen (Satyaraja Dasa), a member of the International Society for Krishna Consciousness. It is dedicated to scholarly research associated with Vishnu-related traditions. In 2002, the journal affiliated with Christopher Newport University and with A. Deepak Publishing.

Its Spring 2012 issue has been described as "a fine volume of interfaith reflection that covers fifteen years of Vaishnava/Christian dialogue, most of which has taken place at an annual conference at Rockwood Manor in Potomac, Maryland".

Francis Xavier Clooney has commented positively on the contribution the journal has made to Hindu scholarly publishing.

Edwin Bryant and Maria Ekstrand describe the journal as a "truly nonpartisan enterprise that highlights contemporary research by major scholars not only of the Chaitanya tradition but also of Vaishnavism in general".

References

External links

Hindu studies journals
Vaishnavism
Publications established in 1992
Christopher Newport University
Biannual journals
English-language journals